The Taos Plateau volcanic field is an area of extensive volcanism in Taos County, New Mexico, United States. The age of most of the vents and associated lava flows in the field is estimated to be between 1.8 and 4 million years, with a few 22-million-year-old vents. The composition of the lavas varies from tholeiitic basalt to rhyolite. Landforms include sheet flows, cinder cones, and shield volcanoes. The sheet flows of the Servilleta Basalt are well-exposed in the Rio Grande Gorge carved by the Rio Grande.

Notable vents
The central part of the field is the most mafic, consisting of tholeiitic basalt shield volcanoes, with andesite vents further out and rhyodacite vents in the outer part of the field. Two small rhyolite domes in the center of the field are exceptions to this pattern.

Origin
The field lies near the intersection of the Jemez Lineament with the Rio Grande rift. Here hot mantle rock has bulged upwards into the rift, allowing a high degree of decompressional melting to produce the tholeiitic magmas. The outer zone of andesites and rhyodacites is interpreted as a lower degree of melting, while the two rhyolite domes are interpreted as resulting from fractional crystallization of magma in the shallow crust.

Economic resources
Perlite is mined from the rhyolite flows and domes at No Agua. The production here has contributed to making New Mexico the leading producer of perlite in the United States.

References

Further reading

External links

Documentary: Sleeping Monsters, Sacred Fires: Volcanos Of New Mexico
 

Volcanic fields of New Mexico
Landforms of Taos County, New Mexico
Miocene volcanoes
Pliocene volcanoes
Pleistocene volcanoes
Rift volcanoes
Neogene geology of New Mexico
Quaternary geology of New Mexico
Miocene United States
Pliocene United States
Pleistocene United States
Basin and Range Province